Microbiology Spectrum is a bimonthly peer-reviewed scientific journal published by the American Society for Microbiology. Topics the journal covers include: archaea, food microbiology, bacterial genetics, cell biology, physiology, clinical microbiology, environmental microbiology, ecology, eukaryotic microbes, genomics, computational and synthetic microbiology, immunology, pathogenesis, and virology. The journal was established in October 2013. Since Spring 2021, the journal is published open access.

Abstracting and indexing
The journal is abstracted and indexed in:

According to the Journal Citation Reports, the journal has a 2020 impact factor of 7.171.

References

External links

Microbiology journals
Open access journals
English-language journals
Bimonthly journals
Publications established in 2013